1987 World Rhythmic Gymnastics Championships were held in Varna, Bulgaria on September 17–20, 1987.

Participants
The following countries sent competitor(s) Argentina, Australia, Austria, Belgium, Brazil, Bulgaria, Canada, China, Cuba, Czechoslovakia, Denmark, Finland, France,  Greece, Hungary, Israel, Italy, Japan, Mexico, The Netherlands, New Zealand, North Korea, Norway, Poland, Portugal, Romania, South Korea, Spain, Sweden, Switzerland, Chinese Taipei, The United Kingdom, US, USSR, West Germany & Yugoslavia.

Individual

Groups
Countries who participated in the group competition are as follows.

Medal table

Individual Final

Individual All-Around

Individual Rope

Individual Hoop

Individual Clubs

Individual Ribbon

Group

All Around
The First Exercise consisted of 3 balls and 3 hoops.  The Second Exercise consisted of 6 balls.

Finals – 6 Balls

Finals – 3 Balls, 3 Hoops

References
RSG.net

External links
FIG - International Governing Body for Rhythmic Gymnastics

Rhythmic Gymnastics World Championships
Rhythmic Gymnastics Championships
World Rhythmic Gymnastics Championships, 1987
International gymnastics competitions hosted by Bulgaria